Alioune Fall (born 30 August 1994) is a Senegalese professional footballer who plays for Championnat National club Red Star as a winger or forward.

References

External links
 

1994 births
Living people
Senegalese footballers
Association football wingers
Primeira Liga players
First Professional Football League (Bulgaria) players
Étoile Lusitana players
G.D. Chaves players
Juventude de Pedras Salgadas players
F.C. Vizela players
Gil Vicente F.C. players
PFC Beroe Stara Zagora players
Red Star F.C. players
Senegalese expatriate footballers
Senegalese expatriate sportspeople in Portugal
Expatriate footballers in Portugal
Senegalese expatriate sportspeople in Bulgaria
Expatriate footballers in Bulgaria
Senegalese expatriate sportspeople in France
Expatriate footballers in France